The Legislative Palace of Peru is the seat of the Congress of Peru, located on the second block of Jiron Ayacucho, on the Plaza Bolivar, in Lima, the capital of Peru. This building is made up of the chamber housing the sessions of congress, the Hemiciclo Raúl Porras Barrenechea chamber, the Hall of the Lost Steps, the offices of the Presidency of the Congress, office of the vice-presidency, the offices of congressional commissions, and the offices of various other parliamentary groups.

This building houses the sessions of Congress as well as the inauguration speech of the President. 

The Plaza Bolivar is located in front of the congressional building while the Plaza Simón Bolívar is located to the rear. 

It was built by the President Óscar R. Benavides.

See also
Historical Center of Lima
Congress of Peru
Lima
Government of Peru

Government of Peru
Buildings and structures in Lima
Government buildings completed in 1936
Neoclassical architecture in Peru
Seats of national legislatures